Vítor Alves may refer to:
Vítor Alves (soldier) (1935–2011), Portuguese soldier
Vítor Alves (footballer, born 1985), Portuguese footballer who plays as a rightback